Dogmatic theology, also called dogmatics, is the part of theology dealing with the theoretical truths of faith concerning God and God's works, especially the official theology recognized by an organized Church body, such as the Roman Catholic Church, Dutch Reformed Church, etc. At times, apologetics or fundamental theology is called "general dogmatic theology", dogmatic theology proper being distinguished from it as "special dogmatic theology". In present-day use, however, apologetics is no longer treated as part of dogmatic theology but has attained the rank of an independent science, being generally regarded as the introduction to and foundation of dogmatic theology.

The term dogmatic theology became more widely used following the Protestant Reformation and was used to designate the articles of faith that the Church had officially formulated. An example of dogmatic theology is the doctrinal statements or dogmas that were formulated by the early church councils who sought to resolve theological problems and to take a stance against a heretical teaching. These creeds or dogmas that came out of the church councils were considered to be authoritative and binding on all Christians because the church officially affirmed them. One of the purposes of dogmatic theology is to formulate and communicate doctrine that is considered essential to Christianity and which if denied would constitute heresy.

Definition
Karl Barth defined Dogmatic theology as the scientific exposition of the entire theoretical doctrine concerning God and God's external activity, based on the dogmas of the Church.

Dogmatic theology emphasizes the importance of propositional truth over experiential, sensory perceptions.

The Roman Catholic Congregation for the Doctrine of the Faith is charged with ensuring fidelity to Catholic teaching regarding theology and doctrine among all members of the Church – especially in disputes or unsolved issues involving theology and the faith, and in dealing with individuals (especially clergy, religious, and catechists, where orthodoxy is a special concern, but also laypeople) whose teachings or statements have been judged erroneous at the local level. In 1989, the Congregation's International Theological Commission  prepared a document on doctrinal theology called "The Interpretation of Dogma". This happened when Pope Benedict XVI was Prefect of the Congregation and thus President of the commission.

Etymology

The term "dogmatic theology" is thought to have first appeared in 1659 in the title of a book by L. Reinhard. A. M. Fairbairn holds that it was the fame of Petau which gave currency to the new coinage "dogmatic theology"; and though the same or related phrases had been used repeatedly by writers of less influence since Reinhard and Andreas Essenius, F. Buddeus (Institutiones theol. dogmat., 1723; Compendium, 1728) is held to have given the expression its supremacy. Noel Alexandre, the Gallican theologian, possibly introduced it in the Roman Catholic Church (1693; Theologia dogmatica et moralis).

Both Roman Catholic and Protestant authorities agree that the expression was connected with the new habit of distinguishing dogmatics from Christian ethics or moral theology, though Albert Schweizer denies this of Reinhard. In another direction dogmas and dogmatic theology were also contrasted with truths of reason and natural theology.

See also
Systematic Theology
Christian apologetics
Christian theology
History of Catholic dogmatic theology
Constructive theology
Dogmatix
Feminist theology
Liberal Christianity
Liberation theology
Process theology
Queer theology

References

 Dogmatic Theology – Catholic Encyclopedia

External links

Dogmatic Theology – Catholic Encyclopedia
History of Dogmatic Theology – Catholic Encyclopedia
 Christian Theology Reading Room, Tyndale Seminary
 Lessons on Eastern Christian Dogmatics, by Rev. John Zizioulas current Metropolitan of Pergamus and Chairman of the Athens Academy

Further reading
Moody Handbook of Theology by Paul P. Enns
Dogmatic Theology by William Greenough Thayer Shedd
Christian Theology (2nd Ed) by Millard J. Erickson

Systematic theology
Christian theological movements
Dogma